Reverend John Mackenzie Bacon, FRAS (19 June 1846 – 26 December 1904) was an English astronomer, aeronaut, and lecturer.

Background
John was the son of John Bacon, the Vicar of Woodlands St Mary in Berkshire, and grandson of John Bacon, the sculptor.

Studies
He was elected a Fellow of the Royal Astronomical Society in 1888. Bacon and John Nevil Maskelyne filed a patent for inflating balloons. He died in Cold Ash in Berkshire.

Eclipses
Both John and his daughter Gertrude were members of the British Astronomical Association. The BAA organised expeditions to observe total solar eclipses, which John and Gertrude went on. The first was to Vadso, Lapland (eclipse date 9 August 1896), which was unsuccessful due to cloudy weather. The second was to Buxar, India (eclipse date 22 January 1898). Here they succeeded in filming the eclipse, but unfortunately the film has been lost.
 The Bacons also went on a ballon flight in November 1899 piloted by Stanley Spencer to observe the Leonid meteors. The flight took off from Newbury at 4:00am on Thursday 16 November and drifted westward with the flight ending near Neath. Very few meteors were observed however. A third eclipse expedition was to Wadesborough, North Carolina (eclipse date 28 May 1900) and was also successful.

References

External links 

 
 
 

1846 births
1904 deaths
19th-century British astronomers
People from Lambourn
People from Thatcham